The following list provides an overview on major legal publishers by language area.

English
Source: Locating the Law, Chapter 12
[Estat Law](India)
Executive Press
LexisNexis, a division of Reed Elsevier, including
LexisNexis Butterworths (UK, Ireland, Canada, Australia, New Zealand, South Africa/Kagiso Media, India/Wadhwa Nagpur)
vLex vLexJustis (US, UK, Canada, Caribbean, Australia, New Zealand, Ireland, India, etc)
West Publishing, a subsidiary of Thomson Reuters, including
Westlaw
FindLaw
Vantage Asia, including
Asia Business Law Journal
India Business Law Journal
China Business Law Journal
Wolters Kluwer, including
CCH (Commerce Clearing House)
James Publishing (United States)
Juta (South Africa)
Lawyers & Judges Publishing Company, Inc. (United States)
vLex (North America & UK)
All India Reporter
PLD Publishers, kausar law book publishers  (Pakistan)
Mainstream Law Reports (Bangladesh)
LDC Publishers (Uganda)
Whitelocke Publications (Oxford, New York, Luxembourg)
Edward Elgar Publishing (USA, UK and International)
Carolina Academic Press (USA)
Bloomsbury Professional (UK and Ireland)
Data Trace Publishing Company (United States)
LexBooK, Athens (Greece and Cyprus)
 (Greece)
The following are or were legal publishers:
ARK Group
Bedford Square Press
Blackstone Press
Blackwell Scientific Publications
Blay's Guides
Butterworths
Cameron May
CCH Editions
Chancery Law Publishing
Codify Legal Publishing
ESC Publishing
Fourmat Publishing
Henry Stewart Publications
Jordans & Sons
Kluwer Law
Legal Action Group
Lloyd's of London Press
Longmans, (Longman Law Tax & Finance)
MBC Information Services
Oxford University Press
Pitman Publishing
Shaw & Sons
Sweet & Maxwell
Trial Guides
Tolley Publishing Co Ltd
Waterlow Directories
Waterlow Publishers
William S. Hein
Whitelocke Publications

French
Lefebvre, including
Dalloz

German
Source: ARSV
Beck, including
Nomos
Boorberg
Deutscher Anwaltverlag
de Gruyter
Heymanns (Wolters Kluwer)
Juris (= Juristisches Informationssystem für die Bundesrepublik Deutschland)
ÖGB Verlag, Vienna
Manz, Vienna
Mohr Siebeck
Otto Schmidt
Schulthess, Zürich
Stämpfli, Bern

Greece, Cyprus
1. Sakkoulas Publications, Athens, Thessaloniki.
2. Nomiki Bibliothiki Publications, Athens.
3. Antonis N. Sakkoulas Publications, Athens.
4. P. N. Sakkoulas Publications, Athens.
5. LexBook, Athens.

Notes

Italian
Source: Overview of the Sources of Italian Law
Giuffrè
Wolters Kluwer Italia, including: 
UTET Giuridica
IPSOA
CEDAM
Maggioli
Giappichelli
Il Sole 24 Ore Editore

Japanese
Source: Japanese Law via the Internet
Dai-Ichi Hoki
Shinnippon-Hoki (Westlaw)
Yuhikaku

Russian
Major database providers are:
ConsultantPlus
Garant
Kodeks

Spanish
Sepín  
vLex vLex (Spain and Latin America)
Thomson Reuters-Aranzadi Thomson Reuters-Aranzadi 
Wolters Kluwer Wolters Kluwer
Marcial Pons Marcial Pons 
Tirant lo Blanch Tirant lo Blanch 
Reus Reus
Dykinson Dykinson
Lefebvre Lefebvre 
Tecnos Tecnos

Hindi
Eastern Book Company (India)

Marathi
Ajit Prakashan (India)

Portuguese
AAFDL - Associação Académica da Faculdade de Direito de Lisboa - Portugal
Almedina - Brazil and Portugal
Gestlegal - Portugal
vLex - Brazil and Portugal

Further reading
Society of Public Teachers of Law Working Party on Law Publishing. Law Publishing and Legal Scholarship. 1977. (contains a list of more than twenty publishers with law lists).

References

Legal